Staro Selo may refer to:

Bosnia and Herzegovina 
Staro Selo (Glamoč)
Staro Selo (Donji Vakuf)
Staro Selo (Kalesija)

Bulgaria 
 Staro Selo, Lovech Province, in Troyan Municipality
 Staro Selo, Silistra Province, in Tutrakan Municipality
 Staro Selo, Pernik Province, in Radomir Municipality
 Staro Selo, Vratsa Province, in Mezdra Municipality

Croatia 
 Staro Selo, Sisak-Moslavina County, a village near Sisak
 Staro Selo, Lika-Senj County
 Staro Selo, Topusko, a village near Topusko

Macedonia 
 Staro Selo, Jegunovce
 Staro Selo, Nikšić

Slovenia 
Staro Selo, Kobarid

Serbia
Staro Selo (Jagodina)
Staro Selo (Prokuplje)
Staro Selo (Velika Plana)

See also
 Novo Selo (disambiguation)
 Stara Sela, Kamnik Municipality, Slovenia